Sichuanese character (Sichuanese Pinyin: Si4cuan1 Fang1yan2zi4) refers to those Chinese characters used only in written Sichuanese. Sichuanese characters are often created as ideogrammatic compound characters (会意字) or phono-semantic compound characters (形声字).

For example, in Sichuanese 𨈓 (Sichuanese Pinyin: nang1)  means thin, and it is created in ideogrammatic compounds as shown in the table below:

Furthermore, 㧯 (Sichuanese Pinyin: nao3), which means to lift in Sichuanese, is created as a phono-semantic compound character as shown in the table below:

Examples

References

Chinese scripts